Vitālijs Orlovs  (born 1964) is a Latvian politician. He is a member of  Harmony and a deputy of the 8th, 9th, 10th, 11th and 12th Saeima. He began his current term in parliament on 4 November 2014. He is of partial Karelian descent.

External links
Saeima website

1964 births
Living people
People from Jēkabpils
People of Karelian descent
Equal Rights (Latvia) politicians
National Harmony Party politicians
Social Democratic Party "Harmony" politicians
Deputies of the 8th Saeima
Deputies of the 9th Saeima
Deputies of the 10th Saeima
Deputies of the 11th Saeima
Deputies of the 12th Saeima
Deputies of the 13th Saeima